Surender Kumar (born 23 November 1993) is an Indian field hockey player, who plays as a defender for the Indian national team.

He was born to Malkhan Singh and Neelam Devi on 23 November 1993. He is from Karnal, Haryana.

He was part of the Indian hockey team that participated in the 2016 and 2020 Summer Olympics.

See also
India at the 2016 Summer Olympics

References

External links
Surender Kumar at Hockey India

1993 births
Living people
Male field hockey defenders
Field hockey players at the 2016 Summer Olympics
Field hockey players at the 2020 Summer Olympics
Field hockey players at the 2018 Asian Games
2018 Men's Hockey World Cup players
Olympic field hockey players of India
Indian male field hockey players
Field hockey players from Haryana
People from Karnal district
Asian Games bronze medalists for India
Asian Games medalists in field hockey
Medalists at the 2018 Asian Games
Hockey India League players
Delhi Waveriders players
Olympic bronze medalists for India
Medalists at the 2020 Summer Olympics
Olympic medalists in field hockey
Field hockey players at the 2022 Commonwealth Games
Commonwealth Games silver medallists for India
Commonwealth Games medallists in field hockey
Recipients of the Arjuna Award
2023 Men's FIH Hockey World Cup players
Medallists at the 2022 Commonwealth Games